The World Aircraft Spirit is a Colombian/American amateur-built aircraft, designed by Max Tedesco and produced by World Aircraft Company. The aircraft was publicly introduced at AirVenture in 2011 and production is expected to commence in 2014. It is supplied as a kit for amateur construction or as a complete ready-to-fly aircraft.

Design and development

The aircraft is made from aluminum sheet. The wing is supported by "V" struts and jury struts.

The Spirit airframe is constructed in Colombia and then shipped to World Aircraft's facility at Henry County Airport in Paris, Tennessee for final assembly and paint. Kits shipped are fully assembled and then disassembled for customer delivery and may be shipped painted as well. Construction time from the supplied kit is estimated as 110 hours.

As of October 2012, the design appears on the Federal Aviation Administration's list of approved special light-sport aircraft.

Operational history
By December 2011 55 examples had been completed and flown.

Specifications (Spirit)

References

External links

Homebuilt aircraft
Light-sport aircraft
Single-engined tractor aircraft